Kabugao, officially the Municipality of Kabugao, , is a 1st class municipality and de jure capital of the province of Apayao, Philippines. According to the 2020 census, it has a population of 16,215 people.

History 
On July 12, 1915, Governor General Francis Burton Harrison issued Executive Order No. 45, transferring the capital of then sub-province of Apayao from Tauit to Kabugao, to be effective on August 1.

Kabugao was occupied for a year by the Japanese during the Second World War. It was captured in December 1942 after the USAFIP NL retreated from the town.

Geography

According to the Philippine Statistics Authority, the municipality has a land area of  constituting  of the  total area of Apayao.

Barangays
Kabugao is politically subdivided into 21 barangays. These barangays are headed by elected officials: Barangay Captain, Barangay Council, whose members are called Barangay Councilors. All are elected every three years.

Climate

Demographics

In the 2020 census, Kabugao had a population of 16,215.

Economy

Government
Kabugao, belonging to the lone congressional district of the province of Apayao, is governed by a mayor designated as its local chief executive and by a municipal council as its legislative body in accordance with the Local Government Code. The mayor, vice mayor, and the councilors are elected directly by the people through an election which is being held every three years.

Elected officials

Education
In 1948, Rev. Louis Saunders of an evangelical Protestant sect, The Disciples of Christ, opened the Apayao Christian Academy, Kabugao's first secondary school. In 1950, amidst rivalry among churches, the Catholics started its own secondary school, Our Blessed Lady of Lourdes.

Dibagat

Dibagat is inhabited by the Isnag and the Ilocano. There is a small grass airstrip built by SIL in 1985. Dibagat is accessible only by canoe or by specialized aircraft.

References

External links

 [ Philippine Standard Geographic Code]

Municipalities of Apayao
Provincial capitals of the Philippines